Anti-submarine drones are unmanned surface vehicles designed to stalk and hunt submarines. They are an emerging technology with a prototype ACTUV being designed by DARPA as a potentially smaller, more efficient Anti-submarine warfare capability for the United States Navy.

See also
Unmanned aerial vehicle

References

Anti-submarine warfare
Emerging technologies